Flavitalea antarctica is a Gram-negative, rod-shaped and aerobic bacterium from the genus of Flavitalea which has been isolated from the Fildes Peninsula from the Antarctica.

References

External links
Type strain of Flavitalea antarctica at BacDive -  the Bacterial Diversity Metadatabase

Chitinophagia
Bacteria described in 2017